is a Japanese manga series written and illustrated by Mitsu Izumi. It has been serialized in Kodansha's Good! Afternoon since November 2017, with its chapters collected in six tankōbon volumes as of June 2022.

Publication
Magus of the Library is written and illustrated by Mitsu Izumi. It has been serialized in Kodansha's Good! Afternoon since November 7, 2017. Kodansha has collected its chapters into individual tankōbon volumes. The first volume was released on April 6, 2018. As of June 7, 2022, six volumes have been released.

In North America, Kodansha USA announced the English language release on the manga in October 2018.

Volume list

Reception
The series ranked 12th on the "Nationwide Bookstore Employees' Recommended Comics of 2018" by the Honya Club website. The series ranked 50th on the 2021 "Book of the Year" list by Da Vinci magazine. French newspaper Le Figaro selected Magus of the Library as one of their six recommended manga featured at the 2019 Paris Book Fair.

See also
7thGarden, another manga series by the same author

Notes

References

Further reading

External links
 

Adventure anime and manga
Fantasy anime and manga
Kodansha manga
Seinen manga